A studio is an artist's or worker's work room. 

Studio or The Studio may also refer to:

Buildings and spaces
 Dock10 (television facility) in Manchester, England also known as The Studios
 Film studio
 Photographic studio
 Recording studio (or Radio studio)
 Studio apartment, a style of apartment
 Television studio
 The Studio, a theatre space in Holden Street Theatres, Adelaide, Australia
 The Studio, a theatre space within the former Metro Arts Centre, Brisbane, Australia

Computing, video and technology
 3D Studio Max, a mesh-animation tool
 Android Studio, an IDE for Android
 GameMaker: Studio, a proprietary game-development tool
 Okam Studio, the videogame developers who wrote the Godot game engine
 Studio editions: different editions of computer products such as:
 JDeveloper Studio Edition, an IDE provided by Oracle Corporation
  My Passport: Studio Edition
 HardSID 4U Studio Edition
 Visual Studio, an IDE by Microsoft
 Xamarin Studio, IDE for Monodevelop

Music
 Studio (band), a Swedish band
Studio (Tages album), an album by Tages
 "Studio" (song), a song by Schoolboy Q

Other uses 
 The Studio (commune), New York artists commune
 The Studio (magazine), British magazine of arts and culture, published from 1893 until 1964
 The Studio (TV channel), former TV channel in the UK and Ireland that aired films

See also